Marta Linares de Martinelli (born December 1, 1956) is a Panamanian insurance broker. She became the First Lady of Panama on July 1, 2009 when her husband, Ricardo Martinelli, became President of Panama. On January 29, 2014, she was chosen to compete for Vice-President of Panama alongside Jose Domingo Arias running for President, but the pair finished in second place.

Early life
Linares was born in Panama City, Panama. She earned a Bachelor's degree in commerce in the United States, at Saint Mary of the Woods College in Indiana. She later studied insurance brokerage at the University of Panama.

Personal life
In 1978, she married supermarket chain owner Ricardo Martinelli, with whom she had three children: Ricardo Alberto, Luis Enrique, and Carolina Elizabeth.

Honours
 
  Two Sicilian Royal Family: Dame Grand Cross of Merit of the Two Sicilian Royal Sacred Military Constantinian Order of Saint George

References

External links

|-

1956 births
Living people
First ladies and gentlemen of Panama
People from Panama City
Saint Mary-of-the-Woods College alumni